The rockhole frog (Litoria meiriana) is a species of frog in the subfamily Pelodryadinae that is endemic to Australia.
Its natural habitats are subtropical or tropical dry shrubland, rivers, freshwater marshes, rocky areas, and caves. They also live in small ponds.

References

Litoria
Amphibians of Western Australia
Amphibians of the Northern Territory
Amphibians described in 1969
Taxonomy articles created by Polbot
Frogs of Australia